The 2000 Montana gubernatorial election took place on November 7, 2000. Incumbent Governor of Montana Marc Racicot, who was first elected in 1992 and was re-elected in 1996, was unable to seek re-election due to term limits. Judy Martz, the Lieutenant Governor of Montana under Racicot for four years, won the Republican primary and advanced to the general election, where she faced Mark O'Keefe, the Montana State Auditor and Democratic nominee. Despite the fact that George W. Bush, the Republican nominee for president in 2000, won the state in a landslide, the race between Martz and O'Keefe was close. However, Martz managed to narrowly defeat him to win her first and only term as governor. This was the last time that a Republican was elected Governor of Montana until 2020, when Greg Gianforte was elected.

Democratic primary

Candidates
 Mark O'Keefe, Montana State Auditor
 Joseph Mazurek, Attorney General of Montana
 Mike Cooney, Secretary of State of Montana

Results

Republican primary

Candidates
 Judy Martz, Lieutenant Governor of Montana
 Rob Natelson, conservative activist and constitutional law professor

Results

General election

Debates
 Complete video of debate, October 15, 2000

Results

References

Montana
Gubernatorial
2000